The flag of Yamalo -  Nenets Autonomous Okrug consists of a blue field charged with a white crown ornament (seen also on the flag of Nenets Autonomous Okrug) and a red strip near the bottom. The flag was officially adopted on 28 November 1996.

History
The flag of Yamalo-Nenets Autonomous Okrug was officially adopted on 28 November 1996.

Design
The flag consists of a blue field with a red strip and a white Tyumen crown design on the lower part of it.

Similarity
The white crown design on the flag is also seen on the flag of Nenets Autonomous Okrug.

References

Flag
Flags of the federal subjects of Russia
Flags introduced in 1996
Yamalo-Nenets Autonomous Okrug
Yamalo